Huntington North High School is a public high school serving all of Huntington County, Indiana. The school is operated by the Huntington County Community School Corporation.

History
Huntington North opened in 1969; the school opened over a month late into the school year due to construction projects. With minimal repairs made to the building over 50 years, a 2019 test that resulted in high carbon dioxide levels led some parents to disenroll their children from the school. A November 2019 referendum to build a new academic wing, performing arts wing and technical education wing failed.

Demographics
For the 2018-19 school year, the demographic breakdown of the 1,459 students was:
White            1,353 - 93%
Black               7 - 0.5%
Asian              6 - 0.4%
Hispanic           62 - 4.2%
Native American    3 - 0.2%
Multiracial        28 - 1.9%

Athletics
Huntington North, home of the Vikings, is a member of the Northeast Eight Conference. The school's colors are red, white, and black.  The girls basketball team took the state title in 1990 and 1995.

Activities
The school yearbook, Deka, won a National Pacemaker Award in 1995.

HNHS fields two competitive show choirs, the mixed-gender "Varsity Singers" and the all-female "Viking Volume". Both groups have claimed caption awards at ISSMA small-school state championships. The program also hosts an annual competition, the Midwest Showcase.

Notable alumni

Lauren Johnson, professional runner
Chris Kramer, (born 1988), basketball player in the Israel Basketball Premier League
E. J. Tackett, professional ten-pin bowler 
Dan Quayle, United States  Vice President from 1989-1993

See also
 List of high schools in Indiana

References

External links
School website
Huntington County Community School Corporation

Public high schools in Indiana
Education in Huntington County, Indiana
Educational institutions established in 1969
1969 establishments in Indiana